Riverfront Times Square is a 293-meter tall skyscraper in Shenzhen, China. Construction started in 2012 and was completed in 2016.

See also
List of tallest buildings in Shenzhen

References

Skyscrapers in Shenzhen